Juan Flores (born 26 November 1940) is a Mexican wrestler. He competed in the men's freestyle welterweight at the 1960 Summer Olympics.

References

External links
 

1940 births
Living people
Mexican male sport wrestlers
Olympic wrestlers of Mexico
Wrestlers at the 1960 Summer Olympics
Sportspeople from Mexico City
Pan American Games medalists in wrestling
Pan American Games bronze medalists for Mexico
Wrestlers at the 1963 Pan American Games
Wrestlers at the 1975 Pan American Games
Medalists at the 1975 Pan American Games
20th-century Mexican people
21st-century Mexican people